In number theory, a multiplicative partition or unordered factorization of an integer n is a way of writing n as a product of integers greater than 1, treating two products as equivalent if they differ only in the ordering of the factors. The number n is itself considered one of these products. The Latin name "factorisatio numerorum" had been used previously. MathWorld uses the term unordered factorization.

Examples
The number 20 has four multiplicative partitions: 2 × 2 × 5, 2 × 10, 4 × 5, and 20. 
3 × 3 × 3 × 3, 3 × 3 × 9, 3 × 27, 9 × 9, and 81 are the five multiplicative partitions of 81 = 34. Because it is the fourth power of a prime, 81 has the same number (five) of multiplicative partitions as 4 does of additive partitions.
The number 30 has five multiplicative partitions: 2 × 3 × 5 = 2 × 15 = 6 × 5 = 3 × 10 = 30.
In general, the number of multiplicative partitions of a squarefree number with i prime factors is the ith Bell number, Bi.

Application
 describe an application of multiplicative partitions in classifying integers with a given number of divisors. For example, the integers with exactly 12 divisors take the forms p11, p×q5, p2×q3, and p×q×r2, where p, q, and r are distinct prime numbers; these forms correspond to the multiplicative partitions 12, 2×6, 3×4, and 2×2×3 respectively. More generally, for each multiplicative partition

of the integer k, there corresponds a class of integers having exactly k divisors, of the form

where each pi is a distinct prime. This correspondence follows from the multiplicative property of the divisor function.

Bounds on the number of partitions
 credits  with the problem of counting the number of multiplicative partitions of n; this problem has since been studied by others under the Latin name of factorisatio numerorum. If the number of multiplicative partitions of n is an, McMahon and Oppenheim observed that its Dirichlet series generating function f(s) has the product representation

The sequence of numbers an begins

 1, 1, 1, 2, 1, 2, 1, 3, 2, 2, 1, 4, 1, 2, 2, 5, 1, 4, 1, 4, 2, 2, 1, 7, 2, 2, 3, 4, 1, 5, 1, 7, 2, 2, 2, 9, 1, 2, 2, ... .

Oppenheim also claimed an upper bound on an, of the form

but as  showed, this bound is erroneous and the true bound is

Both of these bounds are not far from linear in n: they are of the form n1−o(1).
However, the typical value of an is much smaller: the average value of an, averaged over an interval x ≤ n ≤ x+N, is

a bound that is of the form no(1) .

Additional results
 observe, and  prove, that most numbers cannot arise as the number an of multiplicative partitions of some n: the number of values less than N which arise in this way is NO(log log log N / log log N). Additionally,  show that most values of n are not multiples of an: the number of values n ≤ N such that an divides n is O(N / log1 + o(1) N).

See also

Partition (number theory)
Divisor

References
, chapter 12.
.
.
. As cited by MathWorld.
.
.
.

Further reading

External links

Number theory
Integer sequences